The social movement of Meitei language (officially known as Manipuri language) to achieve the officially recognised status of the "Classical language of India" is advocated by various literary, political, social associations and organisations as well as notable individual personalities of Bangladesh, Myanmar, Northeast India (prominently Assam, Manipur and Tripura).

Chungkham Yashawanta, Professor of the Department of Linguistics, Manipur University, is of the opinion that the very social movement is not an easy task, having no room for agitation, and is of purely academic work, needing linguists, historians, archeologists, anthropologists and literary persons.
However, Dr. Moirangthem Nara, a former Cabinet Minister for Arts and Culture and Sericulture of the Government of Manipur and a Member of Manipur Legislative Assembly, is of the opinion that no demands could be met in India and Manipur without any agitation and so, agitations are required to the demand of Meitei language to be improved to the "classical language" status.

Background

2004 – 2012 
In the year 2004, the Government of India set up an official elite category named "Classical languages of India".
According to Jaipal Reddy, the then Minister of the Ministry of Information and Broadcasting of the Government of India, an expert committee had suggested strict criteria for languages to qualify, like that the language should have been in existence for 1,000 years.

In the later years, the Government of India reformed and announced some criteria for a language to be recognized as a "classical language". As of now, there are four criteria:

(i) High antiquity of its early texts/recorded history over a period of 1500-2000 years;

(ii) A body of ancient literature/texts, which is considered a valuable heritage by generations of speakers;

(iii) The literary tradition be original and not borrowed from another speech community;

(iv) The classical language and literature being distinct from modern, there may also be a discontinuity between the classical language and its later forms or its offshoots.

For the languages which are declared as classical languages, 3 benefits are availed by the Government of India.
 Two major annual international awards for scholars of eminence in the concerned language.
 A 'Centre of Excellence for Studies in Classical Languages' can be set up.
 The University Grants Commission (UGC) can be requested to create, to start with at least in Central Universities, a certain number of professional chairs for classical languages, for scholars of eminence in the concerned language.

2013 
Since the year 2013, after learning about the criteria and the benefits of the officially recognised classical languages of India, many people started talking about classical language status for Meitei language (officially known as Manipuri language) in various book released functions as well as in various cultural events.

Notably during July 2013, A. Balkrishna Sharma, the then Vice-President of "Naharol Sahitya Premee Samiti", said "We are also proud to claim Manipuri as a classical language because of the rich tradition of writing maintained by our forefathers".

2014 
In the year 2014, as a part of the social effort, Chungkham Yashawanta, a Professor of the "Department of Linguistics", Manipur University wrote that to fulfill the four criteria for a classical language, there is a need for the scientific analysis of Meitei language and Meitei script, the prehistory and the unbroken history of Manipur, Meitei culture (including religious, philosophical, ideological and artistic traditions), origin and development of Meitei literature, and others.

Fulfilling of the Criteria and subsequent social efforts

2014 
During June 2014, Vinod Kumar Duggal, the then Governor of Manipur, announced that the Government of Manipur had already taken initial steps for getting Meitei language declared as a "classical language" of India. He added that he will request M Okendrajit, the then Education Minister of the Government of Manipur, and through him to the State Government, for the acceleration of the process and the provision of sufficient funds to the experts and the scholars who can contribute towards reaching the goal of achieving the status of a "classical language".

During August 2014, Chungkham Yashobanta, a Professor of the "Department of Linguistics", Manipur University gave a public lecture on the topic "Manipuri Lol Na Classical Language Oinabagi Potchang" as part of the Meitei Language Day (Manipuri Language Day) of the year.
On the same Meitei Language Day, Moirangthem Nara, a Member of Manipur Legislative Assembly, while delivering a public speech, stated that no demands could be met in India and Manipur without any agitation and so the ongoing agitations needed to be continued, in relation to the demand of Meitei language to be improved to a "classical language" status.

2015 
During May 2015, the Manipuri Sahitya Parishad organized its 80th annual meeting. The functionaries of the Manipuri Sahitya Parishad urged the State Government of Manipur to put in necessary efforts so that Meitei language gets recognised as a "classical language". In the event, Gaikhangam Gangmei, the then Deputy Chief Minister of the Government of Manipur, as a chief guest of the event, promised that he would put in his best efforts so that Meitei language gets the "classical language" tag.

2016 
During August 2016, the Meitei speakers dominant areas of Bangladesh, Myanmar and the North Eastern India, mostly from Assam, Tripura and Manipur, people demanded for making Meitei a "classical language". The major event happened on the Meitei Language Day (Manipuri Language Day) of the year. 

On the Meitei Language Day of the year, the "Sahitya Seva Samiti, Manipur-Kakching" celebrated the event on the theme "Manipuri Language should be enlisted in classical language category", at the Library and Information Centre, Kakching Phousupat Leikai, Kakching.
On the same day, "Manipur Language Day Celebration Committee" organised the similar event at Lamyanba Shanglen, Palace Compound, Imphal, in which Paonam Gunindro, a Professor of the Manipur University, gave a public lecture on the theme "Manipuri Lol Bharatki Classical Lol Oihansi" as a resource person of the event.

During May 2016, the Manipuri Sahitya Parishad resolved to exert pressure on the Central Government of India for the recognition of Meitei language as a "classical language". The resolution was supported by Okram Ibobi Singh, the then Chief Minister of Manipur.

2017 
In the upcoming years, 2017 and 2018, many scholars started giving more opinions of Meitei language fulfilling, satisfying or touching all the four criteria laid down by the Government of India for a "classical language".

During August 2017, Thongam Biswajit Singh, the then Works, Rural Development and Panchayati Raj, Commerce and Industries and Information and Public Relations Minister of the Government of Manipur, urged the people for a collective effort for the upgradation of Meitei language to the status of a "classical language", by stressing out the significance of the language.

2018 
Notably, on 21 February 2018, at an event of the International Mother Language Day in Imphal, Paonam Gunindro, a Professor of the "Department of Manipuri" of Manipur University, while delivering a lecture on "Manipuri Lol and Classical language", said that all the four criteria for the declaration of a language as a "classical language" is touched by Meitei language.

During April 2018, the Directorate of Language Planning & Implementation of the Government of Manipur organized a three-day conference on the topic "Classical Language Status in respect of Manipuri Language" at the conference hall of Manipur State Guest House, Sanjenthong, Imphal. Langpoklakpam Jayantakumar Singh, the then Minister of Art & Culture Department of the Government of Manipur, as a Chief Guest of the event, assured that he will take a leading role in the efforts of attaining classical language status for Meitei language for the sake of future generations. Thokchom Radheshyam Singh, the then minister of the Education Department of the Government of Manipur, as a President of the event, while calling upon the people to involve in the movement for inclusion of Meitei language in the classical language list.

During June 2018, on the occasion of World Music Day held at Shri Shri Bal Mukunda Dev Music College, Palace Compound, Imphal, Langpoklakpam Jayantakumar Singh, the then Minister of Art & Culture Department of the Government of Manipur, as a Chief Guest of the event, while delivering a speech on music, took the opportunity to announce that steps to include Meitei language in the list of Indian classical languages had already been taken up. 

During July 2018, on the occasion of the 30th annual meeting of "Writers Forum Manipur", a meeting resolved to urge the Central Government of India to recognise Meitei language as a "classical language". The event was held at the Manipur Hindi Parishad, Imphal.

During August 2018, Dr. Laishram Mahabir Singh, the Director of the Directorate of Language Planning and Implementation, announced that a comprehensively planned proposal was set up to urge the authority concerned to include Meitei language in the classical language of India, for which a high level committee would be formed for the very purpose and a proposal would be sent to the Ministry of Culture, India within that year.

2019 
During August 2019, on the Meitei Language Day (Manipuri language day), Thongam Biswajit Singh, the then Works Minister of the Government of Manipur, proposed a temporary or Ad hoc committee as there was no language commission to spearhead the effort for inclusion of Meitei language as a "classical language" of India. He also said that the matter could be discussed in the Cabinet in the appropriate time.

King's leading efforts

2020 
In the year 2020, Leishemba Sanajaoba, the present King of Manipur, was elected as a Member of Parliament of the Rajya Sabha from the Bharatiya Janata Party (BJP). As soon as he joined politics, he sought attention of the Central Government of India to recognise Meitei language as a "classical language". In the Rajya Sabha, during September 2020, he asserted that Meitei language has all the elements needed for alleviation to the status of a classical language. The proposal was made during one Parliament session held during the COVID-19 pandemic. The Government of India had responded to him asking for the submission of necessary documents to prove that it fulfils the essential criteria to get the status of "classical language".

Sanajaoba informed Manipur's chief minister regarding the central government's response and a committee comprising officials from the Directorate of Language Planning and Implementation and also Directorate of Art and Culture was formed in the very year. In the later years, he was the spearheading leader of the classical language movement.

2021 
During August 2021, on the Meitei Language Day, Leishemba Sanajaoba released a video clip message from his office in New Delhi, announcing that the Central Government of India led by Prime Minister Narendra Modi was considering the proposal and was ready to take up necessary steps in recognition of Meitei language as a "classical language". In the same video, he further stated that it is up to the State Government of Manipur to submit relevant recommendations without which the Central Government could not do much.

2022

June 2022 
During June 2022, at the opening session of two-day 88th foundation celebration of Manipuri Sahitya Parishad, Imphal cum 87th annual meet of the Parishad at JN Manipur Dance Academy auditorium, Leisemba Sanajaoba confidently announced that 70 percent of the process for enlisting Meitei language as the 7th classical language of India have already been completed and the language will surely get the "classical language" status.
He also announced that an empowered committee, constituted by the state Government of Manipur, along with experts, would be forwarded to the Central Government of India and the very committee would be formed soon to send the recommendation. 
At the same occasion, he said:
"Process for inclusion of Manipuri language among classical languages of the country got delayed due to inaction on the part of state government"

July 2022 
During July 2022, while talking to the Imphal Free Press during a programme held at Babupara in Imphal, Th Basantakumar, Minister of Education Department of the Government of Manipur, said that the government had planned a roadmap to collect and prepare all necessary documents and submit them to the Ministry of Culture (India) by September of the very year.

September 2022 
During the first week of September 2022, the annual general body meeting of the "Writer's Forum, Manipur", organised at Manipur Hindi Parishad, Imphal, issued a statement appealing to the Central Government of India, to take up the essential steps to include Meitei language as an Indian classical language. 

During the second week of September 2022, the Directorate of Language Planning and Implementation (DLPI) finalised the documents required for recognition of Meitei language (officially called Manipuri language) as an Indian classical language. The documents were then submitted to Leishemba Sanajaoba. The efforts of the preparation of the documents were helped by DLPI director Th. Chitra, Manipur's Chief Minister N Biren Singh, besides the scholars and the members of language committee. The entire process was thanked by the "Wakhallon Mannaba Apunba" (WAMA), a social organization of Kangleipak.

Negligences and grievances 
During a January 2022 meeting with the Wakhallon Mannaba Apunba (WAMA), Leishemba Sanajaoba expressed that he was deeply unsatisfied with the Department of Language Planning and Implementation's negligence in the documentation works for inclusion of Meitei language among the classical languages. The WAMA expressed that these negligences of the Language Department will make the efforts of Sanajaoba, of raising his voice in the Rajya Sabha, go unsuccessful. 
The WAMA asked the state Government of Manipur for the change of the present Director of Department of Language Planning and Implementation. According to the WAMA, Chitra, the present director, is unfit to hold her official position due to her neglecting and irresponsible acts. The WAMA demanded the DLPI director either to resign the official position or to show the proofs of the progress regarding the efforts to include Meitei language as an Indian classical language. They stated that they would launch an agitation to appoint another director of the committee if the present director failed to show proofs of progress within seven days.

See also 
 Language Movement Day
 Language revitalization

Notes

References

External links 
 
 

Meitei language movements